Cherubino Kirchmayr (1848–1903) was an Italian painter.

He was born in Venice and studied in the Accademia di Belle Arti of that city, where for two years he was also adjunct professor of elements of figure painting. He mainly dedicated himself to genre painting and portraits, and among his works are Ragazzaglia and Chioggiotti. Among his portraits are those of the Albrizzi family, the Countess Anima Morosini, the Hoyos family, and Don Carlos, pretender to the Spanish throne.

References

1848 births
1903 deaths
Painters from Venice
19th-century Italian painters
Italian male painters
20th-century Italian painters
Italian genre painters
Accademia di Belle Arti di Venezia alumni
19th-century Italian male artists
20th-century Italian male artists